Juan Carlos Meza Gutiérrez (born 20 April 1985) is a Mexican professional footballer.

References

1985 births
Living people
Mexican expatriate footballers
Association football defenders
Lobos BUAP footballers
Club Celaya footballers
Correcaminos UAT footballers
C.D. Malacateco players
Unión Deportivo Universitario players
Deportivo Sanarate F.C. players
Deportivo Chiantla players
Ascenso MX players
Liga Nacional de Fútbol de Guatemala players
Liga Panameña de Fútbol players
Mexican expatriate sportspeople in Guatemala
Mexican expatriate sportspeople in Panama
Expatriate footballers in Guatemala
Expatriate footballers in Panama
Footballers from the State of Mexico
People from Ecatepec de Morelos
Mexican footballers